Wu Qian (born 1973) is a Chinese military officer currently serving as director and spokesman of the Information Bureau of Ministry of National Defense of the People's Republic of China.

Biography
Wu was born in Beijing in 1973. After graduating from Weiyu High School in Shanghai, he was accepted to the College of International Relations at National University of Defense Technology. He also earned a Master of Business Administration from the University of Birmingham. 

After university, he was assigned to the Ministry of National Defense of the People's Republic of China. In June 2015 he became the deputy director of the Information Bureau of Ministry of National Defense, rising to the Director in August 2017.

He was promoted to the rank of Senior colonel (Daxiao) in December 2016.

Personal life
He is married and has a daughter.

References

1973 births
People from Beijing
People's Liberation Army officers
Living people
National University of Defense Technology alumni